Pseudotomoxia quadrinotata is a species of beetle in the genus Pseudotomoxia of the family Mordellidae, which is part of the superfamily Tenebrionoidea. It was described in 1936 by Eugene Ray.

References

Beetles described in 1936
Mordellidae